New Jersey's 18th Legislative District is one of 40 in the New Jersey Legislature. As of the 2011 apportionment, the district includes the Middlesex County municipalities of East Brunswick Township, Edison Township, Helmetta Borough, Highland Park Borough, Metuchen Borough, South Plainfield Borough and South River Borough.

Demographic characteristics
As of the 2020 United States census, the district had a population of 230,335, of whom 179,252 (77.8%) were of voting age. The racial makeup of the district was 100,171 (43.5%) White, 16,317 (7.1%) African American, 866 (0.4%) Native American, 82,803 (35.9%) Asian, 85 (0.0%) Pacific Islander, 13,413 (5.8%) from some other race, and 16,680 (7.2%) from two or more races. Hispanic or Latino of any race were 28,325 (12.3%) of the population. 

The district had 158,255 registered voters as of December 1, 2021, of whom 59,460 (37.6%) were registered as unaffiliated, 70,920 (44.8%) were registered as Democrats, 26,137 (16.5%) were registered as Republicans, and 1,738 (1.1%) were registered to other parties.

The district had the highest percentage of Asian American residents of any district statewide, with African American, Hispanic and elderly below statewide averages. Registered Democrats outnumbered Republicans by a better than 2 to 1 margin.

Political representation
For the 2022–2023 session, the district is represented in the State Senate by Patrick J. Diegnan (D, South Plainfield) and in the General Assembly by Robert Karabinchak (D, Edison) and Sterley Stanley (D, East Brunswick).

The legislative district overlaps with New Jersey's 6th and 12th congressional districts.

Apportionment history
Since the creation of the 40-district legislative map in 1973, the 18th District has always been centered around central Middlesex County and has always included East Brunswick, Edison, and Metuchen in every decennial redistricting. In addition to those three municipalities, the 1973 version of the district included South Brunswick, North Brunswick, Helmetta, Spotswood, Milltown, and South River. For the 1981 redistricting, South Brunswick and South River were shifted to other districts but the 18th picked up Monroe Township and Jamesburg. Under the 1991 redistricting, Monroe, Jamesburg, Helmetta, and Spotswood were removed, but South River was restored to the district. For the 2001 redistricting, South Plainfield was added to the district for the first time, Spotswood and Helmetta returned to the district, and North Brunswick and Milltown were shifted to the 17th District.

In May 1991, five-term incumbent Frank M. Pelly was named by Governor James Florio to serve as executive director of the New Jersey Lottery, after Pelly announced that he would not be seeking re-election. In the 1991 Republican landslide, Jack Sinagra took the Senate seat vacated by Democrat Thomas H. Paterniti, while in the Assembly race, Harriet E. Derman and running mate Jeffrey A. Warsh were elected, knocking off Democratic incumbent George A. Spadoro and his running mate Michael Baker. Derman and Warsh won re-election in 1993, defeating former Assemblymember Thomas H. Paterniti and his running mate Matthew Vaughn.

After Christine Todd Whitman became governor in 1994, she named Derman to head the Department of Community Affairs. Republican Joanna Gregory-Scocchi was chosen by a Republican special convention to fill Derman's vacancy. In a November 1994 special election, early favorite Gregory-Scocchi was defeated by Barbara Buono, after disclosures that Gregory-Scocchi's temporary employment firm had hired illegal immigrants.

In the 1995 elections, the Assembly seats swung back to the Democrats, with Barbara Buono holding onto her seat and her running mate Peter J. Barnes Jr. winning too, defeating Republican incumbent Warsh and his running mate Jane Tousman, despite Republicans outspending the Democrats by a 2-1 margin in the bitterly fought battleground district.

In May 2001, Sinagra announced that he would not run for a fourth term, leaving Barbara Buono as the favorite to pick up the seat for the Democrats. Buono went on to win the Senate seat, and in the Assembly, Barnes Jr. won re-election together with running mate Patrick J. Diegnan, leaving all three legislative seats controlled by Democrats for the first time since 1991. Sinagra resigned from the Senate shortly before the election to become a Port Authority of New York and New Jersey commissioner; North Brunswick Township's attorney David Himelman was appointed after the election to fill the remaining weeks of Sinagra's term.

In March 2007, after Barnes Jr. was confirmed to a seat on the New Jersey State Parole Board, his son Peter J. Barnes III was chosen to fill his vacant seat in the Assembly by a convention of Democratic party delegates. Changes to the district made as part of the New Jersey Legislative redistricting in 2011, based on the results of the 2010 United States Census, removed Spotswood Borough (to the 14th Legislative District) and added Highland Park (from the 17th Legislative District).

In the November 2013 gubernatorial election, Barbara Buono chose not to run for re-election, choosing instead to mount an unsuccessful challenge to Chris Christie's bid for re-election as Governor of New Jersey. In the 18th district, Peter J. Barnes III moved from the Assembly to the Senate, winning Buono's seat against East Brunswick mayor David Stahl in a close race. Barnes's seat in the Assembly was won by East Brunswick Township Councilmember Nancy Pinkin.

Upon his appointment to the State Superior Court, Barnes resigned his Senate seat on April 25, 2016.  On May 5, Diegnan was selected without opposition to receive an appointment to the Senate seat by the members of the Middlesex County Democratic Organization. A week later, on May 12, Edison Councilman Robert Karabinchak was selected from a ballot of four candidates to receive appointment to Diegnan's Assembly seat.  Special elections held on November 8, 2016 elected Diegnan and Karabinchak to serve out the remainder of the terms in their seats. Pinkin would be elected to the position of Middlesex County Clerk in November 2020, and would resign her seat on December 31 to take the county office. Democratic committee members in Middlesex County selected East Brunswick Council President Sterley Stanley as her replacement by a 189–136 margin over Edison Council member Joe Coyle on January 12, 2021; he was sworn in on January 27.

Election history

Election results

Senate

General Assembly

References

Middlesex County, New Jersey
18